Andrew "Drew" Roy (born May 16, 1986) is an American actor. Roy was born and raised in Clanton, Alabama. but moved to Los Angeles to pursue an acting career. He is best known for his role in Falling Skies.

Career 
Roy started his acting career with roles in movies such as Curse of Pirate Death and Blink. He made his TV debut on Greek playing the role of omega chi pledge. In 2009, he played Griffin in the television series iCarly. He has also guest starred in episodes of Hannah Montana as Jesse, Miley's love interest, and on Lincoln Heights. He also had roles in short films Tag, Running Up That Hill, and Dissonance.

In 2010, he portrayed Seth Hancock son of Arthur "Bull" Hancock, thoroughbred horse farm owner in the film Secretariat.

In 2011, he landed a lead role as Hal Mason on Falling Skies. He starred as Miles West in the thriller film Sugar Mountain. In 2017, he guest-starred as Joel in the TV show Timeless. He also recurred in the TNT post apocalyptic drama The Last Ship. He had a minor role as Carter in Lifetime movie Blood, Sweat, and Lies. In 2019, he played a supporting role in the film The Murder of Nicole Brown Simpson.

Personal life
Roy is married to Renee Gardner; the couple had a son named Jack in 2017.
Their second son, Levi was born in 2019.

Filmography

Film

Television

References

External links 
 
 

1986 births
Living people
People from Clanton, Alabama
Male actors from Alabama
American male film actors
American male television actors
21st-century American male actors